Robert of Geneva (1342 – 16 September 1394) was elected to the papacy as Clement VII by the cardinals who opposed Pope Urban VI and was the first antipope residing in Avignon, France. His election led to the Western Schism.

The son of Amadeus III, Count of Geneva, Robert became Archbishop of Cambrai and was made a cardinal in 1371. As legate, during the War of the Eight Saints, he is said to have authorized the massacre of over 2,000 civilians at Cesena in 1377. He was elected pope the following year by the cardinals who opposed Urban VI and established himself at Avignon.

Biography
Robert was born in the Chateau d'Annecy in 1342, the son of Amadeus III, Count of Geneva, and Mahaut de Boulogne. Guy de Boulogne was his maternal uncle. Robert studied at La Sorbonne in Paris. In 1359, he was appointed prothonotary Apostolic, became Bishop of Thérouanne in 1361, Archbishop of Cambrai in 1368, and a cardinal on 30 May 1371. From 1373 he held the position of Archdeacon of Dorset, and from 1374 also Prebend of All Saints Parish Church in Middle Woodford in Wiltshire, leaving both positions in 1378. From 1375, he held a living as rector of Bishopwearmouth in County Durham, England, and instead used the income from that highly prized living for his papal election expenses.

In 1377, while serving as papal legate in upper Italy (1376–1378), in order to put down a rebellion in the Papal States, known as the War of the Eight Saints, he personally commanded troops lent to the papacy by the condottiere John Hawkwood to reduce the small city of Cesena in the territory of Forlì, which resisted being added to the Patrimony of Peter for the second time in a generation; there he authorized the massacre of 3,000–8,000 civilians, an atrocity even by the rules of war at the time, which earned him the nickname butcher of Cesena.

In 1392, at the death of his brother, Pierre, he inherited the title of Count of Geneva, his four brothers having each died without issue before him. The title then passed from him through his eldest sister Mary to her son, Humbert de Thoire.

Papal election and reign
Robert was elected pope at Fondi on 20 September 1378 by the cardinals who opposed the return of the Papacy from Avignon to Rome, and the election of Pope Urban VI in the latter town. He chose the regnal name of Clement VII, and became the first of the line of 'popes' (now counted as antipopes) of the so-called Western Schism, the second of the two periods referred to as the Great Schism, which lasted until 1417. Clement had the immediate support of Queen Joanna I of Naples and of several of the Italian barons. Charles V of France, who seems to have been sounded beforehand on the choice of the Roman pontiff, soon became his warmest protector. Clement eventually succeeded in winning to his cause Castile, Aragon, Navarre, a great part of the Latin East, and Flanders. Scotland supported Clement because England supported Urban. He had adherents, besides, scattered through Germany, while Portugal on two occasions acknowledged him, but afterwards forsook him. Burgundy and Savoy also acknowledged his authority.> Unable to maintain himself in Italy, he took up his residence at Avignon in the southern French Comtat Venaissin, where he became dependent on the French court.

By the bait of a kingdom to be carved expressly out of the States of the Church and to be called the kingdom of Adria, coupled with the expectation of succeeding to Queen Joanna, Clement incited Louis I, Duke of Anjou, the eldest of the brothers of Charles V, to take arms in his favour. These tempting offers gave rise to a series of expeditions into Italy carried out almost exclusively at Clement's expense, in the first of which Louis went to war with some 40,000 troops. The campaign was unsuccessful: Louis suddenly died at Bisceglie on 20 September 1384. Still, these enterprises on several occasions planted Angevin domination in the south of the Italian peninsula, and their most decisive result was the assuring of Provence to the dukes of Anjou and afterwards to the kings of France. After the death of Louis, Clement hoped to find equally brave and interested champions in Louis' son and namesake Louis II of Anjou, to which he donated the larger part of the Pontifical States. Clement then tried to ally with Louis I, Duke of Orléans, the brother of Charles VI; with Charles VI himself; and with John III, Count of Armagnac. The prospect of his brilliant progress to Rome was ever before Clement's eyes; and in his thoughts force of arms, of French arms, was to be the instrument of his glorious triumph over his competitor.

There came a time, however, when Clement and more particularly his following had to acknowledge the vanity of these elusive dreams; and at the end of his life he realized the impossibility of overcoming by brute force an opposition which was founded on the convictions of the greater part of Catholic Europe. Moreover, his ambitions and the financial needs of his court had resorted to simony, the loss of land and extortion which discerned among his adherents the germs of disaffection. He had created excellent cardinals, but he seems never to have sincerely desired the termination of the schism.

He died at Avignon on 16 September 1394.

Eventually it was determined that he would be recorded as an antipope rather than as a pope. Uncertainty over who the legitimate pope might be during the time of the Western Schism gave rise to the legal theory called Conciliarism, which claimed that a general council of the church was superior to the pope and could therefore judge between rival claimants.

See also
 Clement Bible

References

Sources

 

Clement VII
Clement VII
14th-century antipopes
Clement 07
Clement 07
Counts of Geneva
Prothonotaries
Clement 07
Bishops of Cambrai
Avignon Papacy